Tilloclytus is a genus of beetles in the family Cerambycidae, containing the following species:

 Tilloclytus balteatus (Chevrolat, 1860)
 Tilloclytus baoruco Lingafelter, 2011
 Tilloclytus bruneri Fisher, 1932
 Tilloclytus clavipes Bates, 1885
 Tilloclytus cleroides (White, 1855)
 Tilloclytus conradti Bates, 1892
 Tilloclytus cubae Fisher, 1932
 Tilloclytus geminatus (Haldeman, 1847)
 Tilloclytus haematocephalus (Chevrolat, 1862)
 Tilloclytus minutus Fisher, 1932
 Tilloclytus neiba Lingafelter, 2011
 Tilloclytus nivicinctus (Chevrolat, 1862)
 Tilloclytus pilosus Zayas, 1975
 Tilloclytus rufipes Fisher, 1942

References

Anaglyptini